Steven A. Sund is a retired  American police officer who served as the tenth chief of the United States Capitol Police from 2019 to 2021. Sund was chief during the storming of the U.S. Capitol in January 2021, after which he resigned.

Education 
Sund received a B.S. and M.S. from Johns Hopkins University, and an M.A. in homeland security from the Naval Postgraduate School.

D.C. Metropolitan police
Sund was a member of the Metropolitan Police Department of the District of Columbia for more than 25 years before retiring in 2015. He was “widely respected in the District and among leaders of U.S. Secret Service, U.S. Park Police” and other law enforcement agencies.

During his career, Sund coordinated a number of National Special Security Events by the Department of Homeland Security, including the presidential inaugurations of 2001, 2005, 2009, and 2013. Sund was part of operations responding to the 2009 United States Holocaust Memorial Museum shooting, the 2012 shooting at the Family Research Council, and the 2013 Washington Navy Yard shooting.  In addition, as Commander of the Special Operations Division he handled dozens of criminal barricades with a record of zero fatalities.

Sund authored many of the special events manuals for the District of Columbia and helped shape the Department of Homeland Security's National Response Framework. He also has instructed the U.S. Secret Service in major events planning and has taught Incident Command System as an adjunct professor at the George Washington University.

Sund retired from the Metropolitan Police Department as Commander of the Special Operations Division. Thereafter he worked for Noblis as the Director of Business Development for National Security and Intelligence.

Capitol Police 
In 2017, Sund joined the United States Capitol Police as the Assistant Chief of Police and Chief of Operations.  In June 2019, Sund was sworn in as the tenth Chief of the United States Capitol Police.

Responding to the 2021 Capitol attack 

Sund was chief when, on January 6, 2021, rioters stormed the U.S. Capitol building while Congress was counting the electoral votes of the 2020 presidential election. Rioters were able to reach the chambers of the Senate and the House of Representatives, marking the first time since 1814 that the Capitol building had been breached.

Capitol Police received major backlash after video emerged of what looked like some officers allowing rioters into the Capitol, and another officer filmed taking a selfie with rioters.

Sund said in February 2021 that on January 3, he contacted House Sergeant-at-Arms Paul D. Irving and Senate Sergeant-at-Arms Michael C. Stenger to request support from the U.S. National Guard in advance of the January 6 joint-session of Congress. According to Sund, his request was denied by Irving who stated concerns about "optics".

Resignation
In the early morning hours of January 7, Sund issued a statement defending the department's response. That afternoon, during a televised press conference,  House Speaker Nancy Pelosi called for Sund's resignation, citing "a failure of leadership at the top" of the department and added that Sund had not contacted her since the event.  (An aide to Pelosi later clarified that Pelosi and Sund had spoken on the evening of January 6, but not after that time).

That afternoon, Sund submitted a letter of resignation stating his intention to remain in the post until January 16. The following day, January 8, Sund's command ended; Yogananda Pittman was sworn in as acting U.S. Capitol Police Chief, the first female and first African American to hold the post.

Aftermath
On February 1, 2021, Sund sent a letter to Speaker Pelosi detailing the events leading up to and including January 6. Sund provided a timeline for the aid he sought from local law enforcement agencies and National Guard units, and an accounting of the meetings he had after the perimeter had been breached while he sought assistance. Toward the end of the letter, Sund acknowledged a breakdown in some systems, which he argued could nonetheless be rectified through provision of resources, training, updates to policy, and accountability. He did not specify which systems failed but pointed to the lack of intelligence, noting officials did not predict an armed assault on the Capitol.

On February 23, Sund testified before Senate committees about the storming.
Sund later stated he regretted his resignation.

On March 3, 2021, Major General William J. Walker, the commanding officer of the District of Columbia National Guard testified in a U.S. Senate hearing. His testimony supported Sund's account of events. Walker testified that he spoke with Sund at 1:49 p.m. Walker said, "It was an urgent plea" from Sund, "and his voice was cracking, and he was serious, he needed help right then and there, every available Guardsman." Within minutes of the call, the Capitol was breached.

Sund maintained that the U.S. Capitol Police "did not fail". He said Capitol Police officers had acted bravely and that, "outnumbered and against tremendous odds", they had maintained the safety of members of Congress.

 
Sund has written a book, Courage Under Fire: Under Siege and Outnumbered 58 to 1 on January 6, published in January 2023 by Blackstone Publishing. It became an “Amazon triple bestseller” in the first week of publication. In the book, Sund highlights failures by several intelligence agencies to heed various warnings of the Jan. 6 attack.

References

Further reading

External links

Defending officers during the January 6 United States Capitol attack
United States Capitol Police officers
Metropolitan Police Department of the District of Columbia officers
United States Secret Service agents
Johns Hopkins University alumni
Naval Postgraduate School alumni
George Washington University faculty
Living people
Year of birth missing (living people)